Typotheriopsis is an extinct genus of Notoungulate, belonging to the family Mesotheriidae, which included several small sized Meridiungulates specialized in digging. It is considered as the sister taxon of the clade including Mesotherium and Pseudotypotherium. Its fossils are known from the Chasicoan and the Huayquerian periods, notably among Late Miocene rocks from the Arroyo Chasicó Formation and the Cerro Azul Formation of Argentina.

Description 

Typotheriopsis chasicoensis was described in 1931 by Angel Cabrera and Jorge L. Kraglievich, with a holotype composed of badly preserved cranial remains from the Arroyo Chasicó Formation of Argentina. Those remains were similar to Pseudotypotherium, but included thicker teeth and less atrophied incisors than in other genera of mesotherid. Later studies expanded this list of differences between Typotheriopsis and Pseudotypotherium. It was large for a mesothere, with a broad skull, and a suborbital fossa on its eye socket which may have hosted a scent gland.

References 

Typotheres
Prehistoric placental genera
Miocene mammals of South America
Chasicoan
Fossils of Argentina
Fossil taxa described in 1931
Cerro Azul Formation
Neogene Argentina